A mbanja is a knife, and a cold weapon. Its blade normally is made of iron, and hilt made of leather,  and is frequently decorated with patterns. The mbanja is a unique melee weapon, which is also a throwing weapon. As it such it closely resembled the tomahawk.

References

Knives